The president of the Liberal Democrats chairs the Federal Board of the Liberal Democrats of the United Kingdom.

The responsibilities of the president are similar to that of chairman of the Conservative Party or chairman of the Labour Party, although the role is elected by the membership for a fixed term.

They are elected in an all-member ballot by Liberal Democrat party members for a three-year term (previously two-year terms). They may serve a maximum of two three-year terms. The next scheduled contest will occur in Autumn 2022 with the winner beginning their term of office on 1 January 2023. The election is conducted using the Single Transferable Vote.

The current president is Mark Pack, who was elected in 2019 and took office on 1 January 2020.

Eligibility to stand

In order to be a candidate for president, the candidate must be a member of the Liberal Democrats and secure the nomination of not less than 200 members in not less than 20 local parties (including, for this purpose, the specified associated organisations representing youth and/or students).

List of party presidents to date

Election results

Elections in the 2020s

2022
Mark Pack was re-elected president of the Liberal Democrats.

Elections in the 2010s

2019
Mark Pack was elected president of the Liberal Democrats.

2016
Sal Brinton was returned unopposed.

2014

There were 25 spoilt/rejected ballots.

2012
Tim Farron was returned unopposed.

2010

There were 64 spoilt/rejected ballots.

Elections in the 2000s

2008

There were 49 spoilt/rejected ballots.

2006
Simon Hughes was returned unopposed.

2004

There were 144 spoilt/rejected ballots.

2002
Navnit Dholakia was returned unopposed.

2000
Navnit Dholakia was returned unopposed.

Elections in the 1990s

1998
Diana Maddock was returned unopposed.

1996
Bob Maclennan was returned unopposed.

1994

There were 114 spoilt/rejected ballots.

1992

There were 71 spoilt/rejected ballots.

1990

There were 55 spoilt/rejected ballots.

Elections in the 1980s

1988

There were 448 spoilt/rejected ballots.

See also
 2017 Liberal Democrats leadership election
 2017 Liberal Democrats deputy leadership election

References

Liberal Democrats (UK)